Aerocaribe was an airline based in Mérida, Yucatán, Mexico. It was a regional affiliate of Mexicana operating services under the Mexicana Inter banner and codeshares with its parent company. It operated almost 120 flights a day. In 2005 Mexicana decided to rebrand Aerocaribe as a low-cost airline, MexicanaClick.

History

Aerocaribe was founded in 1972 as Aerolíneas Bonanza, it started operations on 12 July 1975 under the name Aerocaribe. It was formed by Yucatán private investors of the Alonso family, but was bought by Corporacion Mexicana de Aviación on 23 August 1990. In 1996 Mexicana became part of the Cintra group. Its affiliate AeroCozumel was integrated. Mexicana decided to transfer its fleet of Fokker 100 aircraft to Aerocaribe to rebrand the airline. Its new name is MexicanaClick and it is an attempt to create a Mexican low-cost carrier, starting operations in July 2005. in 2008, with Mexicana's restructuration Click, was announced that it would stop being a Low Cost airline, and change its name to MexicanaClick operating as a regional feeder, for domestic destinations in Mexico. The new airline also started adding to their fleets the Boeing 717, which added a Business class to the airline's ticket offers.

Services
Aerocaribe operated the following services in January 2005:

Domestic scheduled destinations: Cancún, Chetumal, Cozumel, Huatulco, Ixtapa/Zihuatanejo, Mazatlán, Mérida, Mexico City, Monterrey, Oaxaca, Puerto Escondido, Tuxtla Gutiérrez, Veracruz and Villahermosa.
International scheduled destinations: Havana.

Fleet
The Aerocaribe fleet consisted of the following aircraft in January 2005:

2 Fokker F27 Friendship
9 McDonnell Douglas DC-9-30

Other aircraft used throughout the years:

2 Britten-Norman Islander
3 Fokker F27 Friendship
4 Douglas DC-9-14
2 Cessna Caravan
1 Douglas DC-9-15
 BAE Jetstream 31

Accidents and Incidents
On July 8, 2000, Aerocaribe Flight 7831 crashed near Chulum Juarez, (Chiapas) Mexico killing all 19 on board.

On March 15, 1984, Aerocozumel Flight 261 crashed after takeoff from Cancun International Airport, Mexico. No one died in the crash. One of the passengers died of a heart attack while moving through the swamp.

On June 21, 1988, a two engine Aerocaribe flight from Cancun to Chichen Itza returned to the Cancun International Airport after losing hydraulic fuel from left engine. As the plane was coming in for landing, the pilot purposely flew past the runway (possibly because the landing gear was unable to lower) and crashed in the swamp surrounding the airport. The front of the plane with the cockpit tore off from the main cabin. All passengers and crew survived ( two pilots, one flight attendant and approximately 25 American passengers from Club Med). The flight was a day excursion to visit the Mayan ruins on the Yucatán peninsula. The passengers walked for one hour through the swamp to safety. One passenger sustained a mild head wound requiring sutures. The plane remained in the swamp for approximately one year following the crash ( personal communication from Continental Airline pilot). This incident was reported in Mexican newspapers at the time but not in the USA. 2

References
2. https://play.google.com/books/reader?id=gJsn16iP4DwC&hl=en&pg=GBS.PA2California Court of Appeals document 
Defunct airlines of Mexico
Airlines established in 1975
Airlines disestablished in 2005
Mexicana de Aviación
Former Star Alliance affiliate members